ArtRage is a bitmap graphics editor for digital painting created by Ambient Design Ltd. It is currently in version 6, and supports Windows, macOS and mobile Apple and Android devices and is available in multiple languages. It caters to all ages and skill levels, from children to professional artists. ArtRage 5 was announced for January 2017 and finally released in February 2017.

It is designed to be used with a tablet PC or graphics tablet, but it can be used with a regular mouse as well. Its mediums include tools such as oil paint, spray paint, pencil, acrylic, and others, using relatively realistic physics to simulate actual painting. Other tools include tracing, smearing, blurring, mixing, symmetry, different types of paper for the "canvas" (i.e. crumpled paper, smooth paper, wrinkled tin foil, etc.), as well as special effects, custom brushes and basic digital editing tools.

Traditional media simulation and tools

ArtRage is designed to be as realistic as possible. This includes varying thickness and textures of media and canvas, the ability to mix media, and a realistic colour blending option, as well as the standard digital RGB blending. It includes a wide array of real life tools, as well as stencils, scrap layers to use as scrap paper or mixing palettes, and the option to integrate reference or tracing images. The later versions (Studio, Studio Pro, and ArtRage 4) include more standard digital tools, such as Select, Transform, Cloner, Symmetry, Fill, and custom brushes ("Sticker").

Each tool is highly customisable, and comes with several presets. It is possible to share custom resources between users and there is a reasonably active ArtRage community that creates and shares presets, canvases, custom brushes, stencils, colour palettes, and other resources.

Tools and features

Real colour blending

ArtRage offers a realistic colour blending option as well as standard digital RGB based blending. It is turned off by default as it is memory intensive but can be turned on from the Tools menu. The most noticeable effect is that green is produced when yellow and blue are mixed.

The color picker supports HSL and RGB colors.

Custom resources

One of the less well known features of ArtRage is the custom resource options. Users can create their own versions of various resources and tools, or record scripts, and share them with other users. Users can save their resource collections as a Package File (.arpack), which acts similar to a ZIP file. It allows folders of resources to be shared and automatically installed. ArtRage can import some Photoshop filters, but not all. It only supports .ttf (TrueType Fonts) which it reads from the computer's fonts folder.

Package files do not work with versions earlier than 3.5. ArtRage Studio does not support Photoshop filters, or allow sticker creation, and has fewer options overall.
Alternatively, individual resources can be shared directly. Most of the resources have specific file types.

Versions
ArtRage comes in seven current editions. The mobile apps are ArtRage for Android, ArtRage Oil Painter Free for Android, ArtRage for iPhone, and ArtRage for iPad. A version called ArtRage Touch is also available in the Windows App Store for Metro devices. The desktop versions are ArtRage Lite and ArtRage 4. A free demo version of ArtRage 4 is also available. ArtRage 1, ArtRage 2, ArtRage Studio and ArtRage Studio Pro have been discontinued.

Ambient Design releases a new edition of ArtRage on three to four yearly upgrade cycle. There is a major free update halfway through this cycle (the X.5 edition) and ongoing free patches and minor updates. Some updates continue for the previous version, although support is slowly phased out over time. For example, backdated upgrades to Studio Pro included bug fixes, DRM removal for Steam users, and a fix to allow it to work properly on OS X Mavericks, and the iPad version was updated to include Retina support.

ArtRage is also available through Steam. It was part of the very first non-gaming software launch on Steam, on October 10, 2012. The Steam version does not include DRM and can be used without Steam running.

Languages

ArtRage 4 is available in several languages, but the manual is only available in English. The other versions have manuals available in assorted languages. Language is chosen when installing the program (except for the ArtRage 2 alternative editions).

Japanese/Chinese are only available as Alternative Editions in ArtRage 2
 ArtRage Studio & Studio Pro Wacom China Editions support English, Traditional Chinese, and Simplified Chinese.
 ArtRage 2 Japanese Edition supports: Japanese and English interfaces and manuals.
 ArtRage 2 Wacom China Edition supports Simplified Chinese interface.

Release history

New desktop editions of ArtRage are released approximately every three years, with a major .5 update being released halfway through. There is no official release schedule, and new updates are announced as they are ready. The latest edition is ArtRage 4.5, which was released 11 August 2014.

Free demo versions

These were released alongside their respective editions, as trial software. The earlier editions have been discontinued, and only the current ArtRage 4 demo is now available. Work can only be exported to JPEG format and contains an ArtRage watermark. Images larger than 1280x1024 cannot be saved or exported.

 ArtRage 2.2 Free Edition: limited trial version
 Studio Pro Demo Edition: full trial version with some restrictions, expires after 30 days
 ArtRage 4 Demo edition: full trial version with some restrictions
 ArtRage Touch: one week trial through the Windows App Store
 ArtRage Oil Painter Free : limited free app on the Play Store and Amazon App Store
 ArtRage for Android: free download on some Samsung devices via the Galaxy Gifts program

Software downloads

ArtRage is only sold individually as an online download. It can be bought directly from the company website, or through Steam, but is not sold on any other websites. The free demo is only available from the main site. The mobile (iPad and iPhone) versions can only be bought via the Apple app store and cannot be registered on the ArtRage site. The Android version is available from the GALAXY Gift store for specific Samsung devices, and will be made available on the Samsung Apps and Google Play stores.

Upgrades

Upgrading from ArtRage Lite or any pre-existing desktop editions gives a permanent 50% discount on ArtRage 4 (the most recent full desktop edition). This upgrade discount is handled separately by the Steam and the ArtRage stores, so users cannot currently switch between stores.

To upgrade, owners must register their serial number in the ArtRage members area (unless it is a Steam or mobile version). This also allows users to download both the macOS and the Windows versions of their software at any time, an unlimited number of times.

Steam and mobile versions are updated through Steam and the App Store.

Hardware bundles

The ArtRage for Android app was released as part of a bundle deal with Samsung. It is free for the new Samsung Galaxy Note 4 and Samsung Galaxy Note Edge smartphones, distributed through the GALAXY Gifts store, and is available for purchase from the Galaxy App store for other Samsung devices. It was released for sale on the Google Play Store in February 2015.

ArtRage Lite comes free with the Wacom Intuos Draw tablet.

The older editions of ArtRage also come as bundled software with various devices.
ArtRage 2 and ArtRage Studio Pro are still available bundled with several WACOM graphics tablets, as well as various other devices, such as ASUS EP121 tablets, Sony VAIO Laptops, and Adesso Cybertablets. The serial numbers in these cases are handled by the companies distributing the hardware. ArtRage is usually provided as a software download, although it can come pre-installed or on an accompanying CD.

A version of ArtRage called "Ink Art" was included in Microsoft's Experience Pack for the Tablet PC in 2005 and on some older Wacom tablets. Ink Art contained a subset of features offered in the full ArtRage program. Promethean Planet, an educator community, distributes a free version of ArtRage for classroom use on Promethean's range of interactive whiteboards.

Sony Duo PCs
ArtRage is included on the following models from the Sony Duo touchscreen range. 
 Sony VAIO Tap 20
 Sony VAIO Duo 11
 Sony VAIO L24
 Sony VAIO E14P
 Sony VAIO T13
 Sony VAIO Duo 13

Wacom Tablet models
(see full Tablet details here)

System support

ArtRage 4.5 has full 64-bit support on Windows and Macs. There are also iOS supported versions for iPhone and iPad.

ArtRage for Android supports Ice Cream Sandwich 4.0 and later.

∞Mavericks support added in ArtRage Studio/ Studio Pro versions 3.5.10 and 3.5.11  
∞∞ Windows XP support was dropped in the 4.5 update. The XP compatible version of ArtRage 4 is still available for existing and future owners of the program through the member area.
∞∞∞ ArtRage 3 Multithreading is not compatible with Windows 10. Disable this in ArtRage Preferences.
∞∞∞∞Linux support is unofficial.
∞∞∞∞∞ The Wine installer for ArtRage 4 does not currently work, but it can be worked around by copying program files from a Windows installation

Stylus support

ArtRage 4 supports various Wacom stylus features, although they may vary depending on the tool being used.
Pressure, Tilt, Airbrush Wheel, and Barrel Rotation
Wacom Stylus Recognition
Live Tilt (4.5 only)

ArtRage for iPad supports four Bluetooth stylus brands, as well as the Apple Pencil, which has full pressure and tilt support. 
 Wacom 
 TenOne Pogo Connect 
 Adonit Jot Touch Pro
 Adobe Creative

ArtRage for Android supports the native Android system for pressure sensitivity, including the Samsung S Pen.

The desktop editions of ArtRage fully support the following Windows Graphics tablet and Tablet computer drivers:
AES (ArtRage 4.5.10 onwards)
WinTab
RealTime Stylus
Ink Services (ArtRage 2 only)

Supported file types
ArtRage uses a proprietary file type, ".ptg", which stands for "painting". It can only save as PTG and can only open PSD and PTG files using the File|Open command. However, images can be exported to the following formats: PNG, JPEG, GIF, BMP, TIFF and Adobe Photoshop's .psd format. ArtRage can import all of these file types using the File > Import Image or Import Image as Layer command. Importing PTG files will open the PNG used for thumbnail images instead (this can be used to rescue images from corrupted PTG files).

*Only when exported as an individual layer

Transparency
ArtRage supports transparency on imported files, but not on all exported files (for example, GIF and TIFF). It is often easier to export a transparent image as an individual layer, as the Canvas settings can save as opaque on full saves for some file types and in older editions.

Ambient Design
Ambient Design Ltd. is a New Zealand-based software development and publishing firm, specializing in creative applications and user interfaces for artists. It was founded in 2000 by Andy Bearsley and Matt Fox-Wilson. The founders formerly worked for MetaCreations, the developer of Painter, Bryce and Kai's Power Tools, and have worked for Corel, Adobe, Digital Anarchy and Jasc Software. Before that, they developed Deep Paint 3D for Right Hemisphere Ltd, and hid various Easter Eggs in the code.

Awards

December 2004 Microsoft® Tablet PC Does Your Application Think in Ink? grand prize winner for ArtRage 1  
March 2012 "Hot One" Award for Best New Gear from Professional Photographer for ArtRage Studio Pro (edition 3.5) 
March 2014 Parents' Choice Gold Award for ArtRage for iPad

See also
Digital Art 
Digital Painting
Art software
Computer painting
Graphic art software
Raster graphics
List of raster graphics editors
Comparison of raster graphics editors

References

Reviews
.
.
.
.
.
.
.
.
.

External links

Digital art
IOS software
Macintosh graphics software
MacOS graphics software
Raster graphics editors
Windows graphics-related software